Carolina Di Domenico (born 5 April 1979 in Naples) is an Italian television and radio presenter. She started her career by presenting the Italian version of Disney Club on Rai 1. She has then worked for MTV Italia. She co-hosted the allocation draw, the opening ceremony and the press conferences for the 2022 Eurovision contest as well.

Television
 Disney Club (Rai 1, 1999–2000; Rai 2, 2000–2003)
 MTV day (MTV, 2003)
 Dancefloor chart (MTV, 2003)
 TRL (MTV, 2004–2005)
 EMA (MTV, 2004)
 A night with (MTV, 2005–2008)
 Hitlist Italia (MTV, 2006–2008)

References

External links 

1979 births
Italian television presenters
Italian women television presenters
Italian radio presenters
Italian women radio presenters
Living people